Quercus aristata is a species of oak. It is native to western Mexico, found in Sinaloa, Nayarit, Jalisco, and Guerrero.

Description 
The leaves are stiff and leathery, up to 12 cm long, often with sharp pointed teeth along the edges.

References

aristata
Trees of Sinaloa
Trees of Nayarit
Trees of Jalisco
Trees of Guerrero
Plants described in 1841
Endemic oaks of Mexico